Erkki Antero Kourula (born 12 June 1948) is a Finnish judge who served as a judge of the International Criminal Court (ICC).

Judge Kourula was elected for an initial term of three years in the first election of judges to the court in 2003, and was re-elected in 2006 for a further nine-year term. He was elected from List B, the list of judges with specific experience and knowledge of international law. List A consists of judges who have experience in criminal law. At the ICC, Judge Kourula is a member of the appeals division, a position he has held since his election to the court. He is the first Finn to be elected as an International Criminal Court judge.

Judge Kourula holds a degree in law from the University of Helsinki and a doctorate in international law from the University of Oxford. In 1979, he was appointed as a judge of first instance in Finland. Between 1982 and 1983, he was a professor of international law at the University of Lapland and he later worked in various roles within the Finnish government, including as the director-general of legal affairs in the Ministry of Legal Affairs, as ambassador to the Council of Europe, and as legal advisor at the Permanent Mission of Finland to the United Nations, where he monitored the establishment of international tribunals to investigate allegations of war crimes in Rwanda and the former Yugoslavia. He was also the head of the Finnish delegation to the Rome Conference on the Establishment of an International Criminal Court, where the formation of the ICC was initially approved.

He is married to Dr. Pirkko Kourula and they have two children. He speaks Finnish, English, French, Russian, Swedish and German.

References

1948 births
Living people
20th-century Finnish judges
International Criminal Court judges
University of Helsinki alumni
Alumni of the University of Oxford
Date of birth missing (living people)
Finnish judges of international courts and tribunals
21st-century Finnish judges